The Grand Rapids Police Department is a municipal police department within Grand Rapids in the state of Michigan, United States.

History

19th century 
Prior to the founding of the police department, the city used contracted individuals, with Henry Baker becoming the first watchman in 1856 who patrolled what is now downtown Grand Rapids. The Grand Rapids Police Department was established in 1871 with eight patrolmen operating under one chief. The police department originally operated under the direction of the mayor and city council, though a separate board of commissioners was created for police and fire department in 1881, initially creating conflict between city officials and the board.To date, the GRPD headquarters has been in four different buildings; none of the previous sites remain standing today. The first police headquarters consisted of a two-room office suite located over the Rice & Moore grocer at 101 Monroe Avenue in downtown Grand Rapids. In 1882, the department moved to the intersection of Lyon and Campau and ten years later in 1892, a new headquarters was built at the intersection of Crescent and Ottawa designed by notable Detroit-based architect Elijah E. Meyers. The newly built headquarters had two cells, two jailer rooms and a boiler in the basement.

20th century 

During the 1911 Grand Rapids furniture workers' strike, GRPD was involved in clashes during the Widdicomb Plant riot that saw officers fire into a crowd of protesters, though no gunshot injuries were reported. The Crescent and Ottawa police station was expanded in 1915. As the third headquarters was being torn down in 1965, old police records were also disposed of in the process.

In 1967, the department moved to the newly built Hall of Justice, located on the site of the present-day DeVos Place convention center on Monroe Avenue. That year the race riots of the long, hot summer of 1967 occurred, with police responding in July 1967 to riots in the African American community in the South Division area of Grand Rapids and armed white vigilantes who patrolled the streets.

21st century 
In 2001, the department moved into the current headquarters at a fifth location, a renovated Herpolsheimer's department store located at 1 Monroe Center NW. The GRPD faced increased controversy with the residents of Grand Rapids in the 2010s. Beginning in 2010, the GRPD watch commander's office telephone line, Line 3407, was labeled as "unrecorded", though it began recording the conversations of callers.  In 2017, GRPD officers detained five teenagers innocent of any wrongdoing at gunpoint while later that year, officers handcuffed an 11-year-old girl at gunpoint without facing discipline.

In 2019, the Eric Payne was named police chief, serving as the first African American leader of the department. The GRPD faced controversy in 2019 after Grand Rapids officials deleted recording from the Line 3407, with Senior Staff Attorney Miriam Aukerman of the American Civil Liberties Union stating "You’ve got to wonder what is so damaging that was on those recordings that the city had to destroy them over the weekend in order to keep the public from seeing them". Chief Payne oversaw the department during the COVID-19 pandemic and the George Floyd protests in Grand Rapids, when police were involved with clashes and responded to looting and fires. During the 2020 protests, an officer who shot a tear gas canister at the face of a protester received a two-day suspension. A year after the protests, Chief Payne would announce his retirement.

In March 2022, Eric Winstrom, a 20-year veteran of the Chicago Police Department was sworn in as police chief for GRPD. Shortly thereafter, GRPD faced widespread scrutiny following the April 2022 killing of Patrick Lyoya, with The New York Times writing "Mr. Lyoya’s death was the latest in a series of incidents that have strained relations between residents and the Grand Rapids police".

Fallen officers 
A total of fifteen GRPD officers have been killed since the department's first recorded death in 1895. The first killed was detective George Powers who was shot on August 22, 1895, while attempting to arrest train robbery suspects on a Grand Rapids and Indiana Railroad train at the city's Grand Trunk Western Railroad crossing. Fourteen of those officers died on-duty, while one was killed off-duty attempting to rescue an electrocution victim. Of those killed on-duty, eight were killed by gunfire and six were killed in traffic accidents.

Equipment

Patrol vehicles 

The GRPD utilizes the Ford Police Interceptor Utility SUV for marked patrol vehicles.

The department also utilizes a number of other platforms for specialized patrol functions, including bicycles, segways, and horses.

Firearms 
The GRPD issues the 9mm Glock 17 as its primary service weapon. The department chose the Glock in 2014 as a replacement for the previously issued .40 caliber Sig Sauer P229 pistol.

In 2015, the department began deploying Colt M4 semi-automatic rifles in marked patrol vehicles to supplement the shotguns that were already carried.

Less-lethal 
GRPD officers carry a number of less-lethal options, including pepper spray, collapsible batons, and tasers.

Body cameras 
All GRPD uniformed patrol officers wear Axon 3 body cameras.

References

Grand Rapids, Michigan
Municipal police departments of Michigan